miR-101 microRNA precursor is a small non-coding RNA  that regulates gene expression. Expression of miR-101 has been validated in both human (MI0000103, MI0000739) and mouse (MI0000148). This microRNA appears to be specific to the vertebrates and has now been predicted or confirmed in a wide range of vertebrate species (MIPF0000046). The precursor microRNA is a stem-loop structure of about 70 nucleotides in length that is processed by the Dicer enzyme to form the 21-24 nucleotide mature microRNA.  In this case the mature sequence is excised from the 3' arm of the hairpin.

Survival analysis shows that hsa-miR-101 is associated with survival in multiple breast cancer datasets.

References

Further reading

External links 
 
 miRBase family MIPF0000046

MicroRNA
MicroRNA precursor families